Psychosis is a generic psychiatric term for a mental state characterized by loss of contact with reality.

Psychosis or psychotic may also refer to:
Brief psychotic disorder, The Diagnostic and Statistical Manual of Mental Disorders, Fourth Edition, Text Revision (DSM-IV-TR) describes brief psychotic disorder based primarily on duration of symptoms. DSM-IV defines brief psychotic disorder as an illness lasting from 1 day to 1 month, with an eventual return to the premorbid level of functioning 
Brief reactive psychosis, psychosis which can be triggered by an extremely stressful event in the life of a patient
Menstrual psychosis, abnormal behaviour linked to menstruation
Manic-depressive psychosis in bipolar disorder, especially manic episodes, can include psychotic features
Mystical psychosis, a term coined to characterize first-person accounts of psychotic experiences that are strikingly similar to reports of mystical experiences
Myxedematous psychosis, a relatively uncommon consequence of hypothyroidism or patients who have had the thyroid surgically removed
Occupational psychosis, the concept that one's occupation or career makes that person so biased that they could be described as psychotic
Postpartum psychosis, a group of mental illnesses with the sudden onset of psychotic symptoms following childbirth
Psychotic break, an occasion of a person experiencing an episode of acute primary psychosis, either for the first time or after a significant period of relative asymptomaticity
Psychotic depression, a type of depression that can include symptoms and treatments that are different from those of non-psychotic major depressive disorder
Shared psychosis, a psychiatric syndrome in which symptoms of a delusional belief are transmitted from one individual to another
Stimulant psychosis, a psychotic disorder that appears in some people who abuse stimulant drugs
Substance-induced psychosis, a form of substance-related disorder where psychosis can be attributed to substance use
Tardive psychosis, a form of psychosis distinct from schizophrenia and induced by the use of current (dopaminergic) antipsychotics by the depletion of dopamine and related to the known side effect caused by their long-term use, tardive dyskinesia

Culture

4.48 Psychosis, a play by Sarah Kane, first staged on 23 June 2000
"Psychosis", a song by Poets of the Fall from their album Revolution Roulette
"Psychosis", a song by Hawkwind from their 1980 album Levitation
"Psychosis", a song by U.K. Subs
"Psychosis", a song by The Refreshments
 Psychosis (album), an album by Cavalera Conspiracy
Psychotic, a 2002 film starring Camille Anderson
Psychosis (film), a 2010 film starring Charisma Carpenter
"Psychotic Reaction", a 1966 garage rock top ten hit from the band Count Five
Psychosis, a 1990 video game for the TurboGrafx-16/PC Engine

Other uses

Psychosis, a stage name of wrestler Dionicio Castellanos
Psychosis (journal), a peer-reviewed medical journal
Psychosis, a metal band from the U.S. city of Detroit, Michigan